Julio César Manzur Caffarena (born 22 January 1981) is a Paraguayan former footballer who last played for Rubio Ñu of the Paraguayan Primera División.

Club career

Manzur started his career at Cerro Corá in his native country before moving to Paraguayan giants Guaraní. He also played for Santos F.C. in Brazil, C.F. Pachuca in Mexico and Libertad in his native country.

In 2009, he joined Tigre to play in the Primera División Argentina and the Copa Sudamericana.

In 2010, he joined Club Olimpia from Paraguay, to play the National Tournament of that country, scoring his first goal on 13 March, against 3 de Febrero from Ciudad del Este, which allowed his team to win the match. He then returned to Mexico to play for Second Division side Club León, to replace Paraguayan international and partner Denis Caniza. León is owned by Grupo Pachuca, owners of his previous club Pachuca CF. Manzur returned to his former club Guaraní in 2011 and then returned to Paraguayan giants Olimpia in January 2013.

International career
Manzur was part of the silver medal-winning Paraguay national team on the 2004 Summer Olympics. On 4 August, before the Summer Olympics began, he played in a preparation game against the Portugal of Cristiano Ronaldo in the city of Algarve, resulting in a 5–0 defeat.

He was also selected to participate in the 2006 FIFA World Cup and the 2007 Copa América. He has won 26 caps for the Paraguay national side.

Honours

Club
 Santos F.C.
 Campeonato Paulista: 2006
 C.F. Pachuca
 North American SuperLiga: 2007
 CONCACAF Champions League: 2008

National team
 Paraguay
 Olympic Games: Silver Medal in Athens (2004)

References

External links
 
 Julio César Manzur at Goal.com

1981 births
Living people
Sportspeople from Asunción
Paraguayan footballers
Paraguayan expatriate footballers
Paraguay international footballers
Paraguayan people of Lebanese descent
Club Guaraní players
Club Olimpia footballers
Santos FC players
Club Atlético Tigre footballers
C.F. Pachuca players
Club León footballers
Club Rubio Ñu footballers
Olympic footballers of Paraguay
Footballers at the 2004 Summer Olympics
Olympic silver medalists for Paraguay
2004 Copa América players
2006 FIFA World Cup players
2007 Copa América players
Paraguayan Primera División players
Argentine Primera División players
Liga MX players
Expatriate footballers in Mexico
Expatriate footballers in Brazil
Expatriate footballers in Argentina
Place of birth missing (living people)
Olympic medalists in football
Association football defenders
Medalists at the 2004 Summer Olympics
Sportspeople of Lebanese descent